Halysis is a genus of red alga thought to fall in the coralline stem group.  It has only been recovered in thin sections, and thus is only known in two dimensions; however, an interpretation as a sheet of cells rather than a sheet of tubes or a single row of cells is the most plausible.

See also

References

Red algae genera
Fossil algae
Paleozoic life of Newfoundland and Labrador